Exostosin-like 2 is a protein that in humans is encoded by the EXTL2 gene. EXTL2                        Glycosyltransferase is required for the biosynthesis of heparan-sulfate and responsible for the alternating addition of beta-1-4-linked glucuronic acid (GlcA) and alpha-1-4-linked N-acetylglucosamine (GlcNAc) units to nascent heparan sulfate chains. (https://www.phosphosite.org/overviewExecuteAction?id=5020882)

References

Further reading

External links 
 PDBe-KB provides an overview of all the structure information available in the PDB for Mouse Exostosin-like 2